Sidney Levine (July 9, 1918 – June 10, 1999) was an American professional basketball player. Levine played in the National Basketball League for the Pittsburgh Raiders during the 1944–45 season. He appeared in 18 games and averaged 0.5 points per game.

References

1918 births
1999 deaths
American men's basketball players
Basketball players from Pittsburgh
Guards (basketball)
Jewish men's basketball players
Pittsburgh Raiders players